Eneritz Iturriagaetxebarria Mazaga (sometimes translated as Iturriagaechevarria or Iturriaga Echevarri; born 16 September 1980 in Abadiño, Basque Country) is a Spanish former racing cyclist. She now works as a directeur sportif for UCI Women's Continental Team .

She participated in the 2012 UCI Road World Championships.

Major results

2002
1st  National Time Trial Championships
2003
1st  National Road Race Championships
1st Stage 1 Emakumeen Euskal Bira
2004
1st Stage 5 Holland Ladies Tour
2005
1st  National Time Trial Championships
2006
1st  National Time Trial Championships
2008
1st Stage 6 Trophée d'Or Féminin
2009
3rd Overall La Route de France
2011
1st  National Time Trial Championships

References

External links
 
 

1980 births
Living people
People from Abadiño
Cyclists from the Basque Country (autonomous community)
Spanish female cyclists
Cyclists at the 2004 Summer Olympics
Olympic cyclists of Spain
Sportspeople from Biscay
Directeur sportifs